Carcelimyia is a genus of flies in the family Tachinidae.

Species
Carcelimyia dispar (Macquart, 1851)

Distribution
Australia.

References

Tachinidae genera
Exoristinae
Diptera of Australasia